Juan Carlos Aramburu (February 11, 1912 – November 18, 2004) was the Roman Catholic Archbishop of Buenos Aires, Argentina, from 1975 to 1990, and was named to the College of Cardinals by Pope Paul VI in 1976.

Biography
Aramburu was born in rural Reducción, in the Province of Córdoba, Argentina. He was ordained a priest in 1934 and became a bishop in 1946, serving successively as auxiliary bishop, diocesan bishop (from 1953), and first archbishop (from 1957) of Tucumán. He created ten new parishes and built chapels in this diocese, as well as a House of Spiritual Exercises. His intense pastoral work included giving the Confirmation to more than 1,000 people in one day.

In 1967 he was named coadjutor archbishop of Buenos Aires, and on April 22, 1975, he was installed as archbishop, succeeding Antonio Caggiano. He was elevated to cardinal one year later, on May 24, 1976.

Aramburu was the second youngest bishop in the history of the Argentine Church, and served for 70 years of priesthood, during which he consecrated ten bishops. At his death, he was the senior bishop by date of consecration in the entire Catholic Church. Active in retirement, he suffered a fatal cardiac failure as he prepared to hear confessions at the Shrine of San Cayetano.

Collaboration with National Reorganization Process
The year of Aramburu's elevation to cardinal coincided with the beginning of the National Reorganization Process. The Mothers of the Plaza de Mayo, a group looking for information on their children who suffered forced disappearance, wrote to top members of the ecclesiastical hierarchy for help, including Aramburu, but it did not get any response. Also, Aramburu did not denounce the murder of bishop Enrique Angelelli, conducted by a military task force and disguised as a road accident; instead, he claimed that there was no evidence of it being a crime.

In 1982, during a trip to Italy, Aramburu was interviewed by the Roman newspaper Il Messaggero and replied to a question about forced disappearances saying: "I don't understand how this question of guerrillas and terrorism has come up again; it's been over for a long time." On the issue of common graves with unidentified bodies being discovered, he claimed: "In Argentina there are no common graves. ... Everything was recorded in the regular fashion in the books. The common graves belong to people who died without the authorities being able to identify them. Disappeared? Let's not confuse things. You know that there are 'disappeared people' who live quietly in Europe."

In 2002, an organization composed of children of disappeared people organized a protest to accuse Aramburu of collaborationism with the National Reorganization Process. The Argentine Episcopal Conference released a document in defense of Aramburu. Rubén Capitanio, a priest, sent a critical letter to the Conference where he mentioned, among other things, that Aramburu had given Holy Communion to people "that [he] knew were responsible of horrible public crimes" and that he had overlooked the human rights abuses at the Navy Mechanics School, within his jurisdiction.

References

External Links 
 
 
 Juan Carlos Aramburu at Cardinal Rating.

1912 births
2004 deaths
People from Córdoba Province, Argentina
Argentine people of Basque descent
Pontifical Gregorian University alumni
Argentine cardinals
Roman Catholic archbishops of Buenos Aires
Participants in the Second Vatican Council
20th-century Roman Catholic archbishops in Argentina
Burials at Buenos Aires Metropolitan Cathedral
Cardinals created by Pope Paul VI
Argentine Roman Catholic archbishops
Roman Catholic bishops of Tucumán
Roman Catholic archbishops of Tucumán
Argentine expatriates in Italy